Enmakaje  is a village in Kasaragod district in the state of Kerala, India.
The administrative capital of the village is Perla, Kasaragod.

Demographics
 India census, Enmakaje had a population of 11773 with 5932 males and 5841 females.

Transportation
Local roads have access to National Highway No.66 which connects to Mangalore in the north and Calicut in the south.  The nearest railway station is Manjeshwar on Mangalore-Palakkad line. There is an airport at Mangalore.

Schools
 SSHSS Katukukke
 SNHS Perla
 MIALP School, Kannatikana
 Little Flower English Medium School
 GHSS Padre Vaninagar
 SSHSS SHENI

Languages
It is a multi-lingual region. The people speak Malayalam, Kannada, Tulu, Beary bashe, and Konkani. Migrant workers also speak Hindi and Tamil languages. This village is part of Manjeshwaram assembly constituency which is again part of Kasaragod (Lok Sabha constituency)

Destruction caused by pesticide 
From 1975 onwards, the pesticide Endosulfan was used for various plantations in Enmakaje without any restrictions or control. This resulted in a huge number of deaths as well as serious injuries. Majority of the 4,000 deaths caused by Endosulfan in the Kasargode District occurred in Enmakaje. Padre village in the Enmakaje Panchayath was the most severely affected area, partly because it is surrounded on all sides by cashew nut plantations.

References

Manjeshwar area